Zdobysław Stawczyk (1 June 1923 – 1 September 2005) was a Polish sprinter. He competed in the men's 200 metres at the 1952 Summer Olympics.

References

External links

1923 births
2005 deaths
Athletes (track and field) at the 1952 Summer Olympics
Polish male sprinters
Olympic athletes of Poland